Tijl Beckand (born 30 July 1974) is a Dutch television presenter and comedian. He is known as one of the comedians in the television show De Lama's together with Ruben Nicolai, Ruben van der Meer and Jeroen van Koningsbrugge. He also presents the television show De Verraders.

Career 

In 2010, he was one of the team captains in the television show Gehaktdag.

He was the team captain of the male team in the game show De Jongens tegen de Meisjes between 2011 and 2018.

In 2021 and 2022, he presented the television show De Verraders. He presented the quiz show De 1% Quiz in 2022.

References

External links 

 

Living people
1974 births
Dutch male comedians
Dutch game show hosts
Mass media people from The Hague
21st-century Dutch people